The Crevedia is a left tributary of the river Colentina in Romania. It discharges into the Colentina in the village Crevedia.

References

Rivers of Romania
Rivers of Dâmbovița County